Turnover is an American independent comedy-drama film written and directed by Linda Palmer and starring Paul Guilfoyle as a cafe owner who leaves his disgruntled manager (played by Riker Lynch) in charge of the business. The film was premiered at the 2019 Idyllwild International Festival of Cinema and lated was released by Indie Rights.

Turnover received positive reviews from critics. On review aggregator website Rotten Tomatoes, the film has an approval rating of 100% based on 14 reviews. It received Best Feature Award at the Idyllwild International Festival of Cinema, Best Comedic Feature at the Manhattan Film Festival and more than 20 other awards and nominations at the independent festivals.

Cast
 Paul Guilfoyle as Peter
 Julia Silverman as Gladys
 Riker Lynch as Henry
 Adwin Brown as William
 Isabella Blake-Thomas as Pepper
 Blair Williamson as Charlie
 Jamie Brewer as Gina
 Carlos Carrasco as Miguel
 Donna Mills as Pat
 Beverly Todd as Ruth
 Ellen Gerstein as	Cherub
 Elina Madison	as	Charlotte
 Kat Kramer as	Fran

References

External links

2019 films
2019 independent films
American independent films
Films set in California